Typhoon Francisco, known in the Philippines as Typhoon Urduja, was a powerful typhoon that strengthened to the equivalent of a Category 5 on the Saffir-Simpson scale, according to the Joint Typhoon Warning Center. The 25th named storm and the 10th typhoon of the 2013 Pacific typhoon season, Francisco formed on October 16 east of Guam from a pre-existing area of convection. With favorable conditions, it quickly intensified into a tropical storm before passing south of Guam. After stalling to the southwest of the island, Francisco turned to the northwest into an environment of warm waters and low wind shear, becoming a typhoon. Gradual weakening ensued, and after the typhoon turned to the northeast, Francisco deteriorated into a tropical storm on October 24. Passing southeast of Okinawa and mainland Japan, the storm accelerated and became extratropical on October 26, dissipating later that day.

On Guam and in the Northern Marianas Islands, Francisco produced tropical storm force wind gusts, strong enough to knock over some trees and cause $150,000 (2013 USD) in damage. Later, Francisco brought gusty winds and some rainfall to Okinawa. In Kagoshima Prefecture, 3,800 homes lost power, while an island-wide evacuation advisory was issued for Izu Ōshima after Typhoon Wipha spawned a deadly mudslide a week prior.

Meteorological history

Initially the system was located within an area of moderate wind shear, although conditions gradually became more favorable for tropical cyclogenesis. A few hours later, the Joint Typhoon Warning Center (JTWC) issued a tropical cyclone formation alert before initiating advisories on Tropical Depression 26W early on October 16. After formation, the system moved west-southwestward under a ridge to the north. Its circulation consolidated as the thunderstorm activity organized, aided by warm sea surface temperatures and decreasing wind shear. At 06:00 UTC on October 16, the JMA upgraded the depression to Tropical Storm Francisco (1327).

As a quickly organizing tropical cyclone, Francisco developed an eye feature late on October 16 in the center of the convection, as outflow improved and an anticyclone formed aloft. Based on the improved structure, the JMA upgraded Francisco to a severe tropical storm at 18:00 UTC on October 16, followed by upgrading it to typhoon status at 06:00 UTC the next day. Francisco slowed its forward motion as steering currents weakened, with a north-northwest drift beginning on October 17 due to an extension of the subtropical ridge. The track accelerated more to the northwest, steered by the strengthening ridge. With the eyewall convection become more distinct, Francisco continued to intensify, and the JTWC upgraded it to a super typhoon on October 18.

After maintaining its peak intensity for about 36 hours, Francisco began weakening, after the eye lost definition due to building wind shear. By October 21, the eye became ragged and cloud-filled while the overall satellite presentation of the storm became elongated. That day, the typhoon entered the area of responsibility of the Philippine Atmospheric, Geophysical and Astronomical Services Administration (PAGASA), which gave Francisco the local name Urduja; the agency would cease issuing advisories on October 23. Conditions generally remained favorable, allowing the eye to remain distinct despite a great reduction in the sustained winds. Dry air began affecting the tropical cyclone late on October 22, cutting off the flow of moist air, and water temperatures cooled along the storm's track. As a result, the eye dissipated and the convection weakened. An approaching trough from the Korean peninsula weakened the ridge to the north, slowing the typhoon and allowing it to turn north and northeast on October 24. The storm began interacting with the approaching cold front while it passed south of Japan, moving around the subtropical ridge. With increasing wind shear, the circulation became exposed from the convection, and the JTWC discontinued advisories on October 25, declaring that Francisco was becoming extratropical. On the next day, Francisco completed its extratropical transition, but dissipated later on October 26, to the southeast of Japan.

Preparations and impact
While Francisco was developing near Guam, the local National Weather Service office issued a tropical storm watch for Guam, Rota, Tinian, and Saipan. On Guam, 1,223 people evacuated to nine schools serving as emergency shelters. A cross country invitational was delayed by one day due to the storm. As a developing system, Francisco passed south of Guam and the Northern Marianas Islands. Wind gusts were not as strong when the typhoon approached the islands for a second time. Damage in the region totaled $150,000 (2013 USD), and was largely limited to fallen trees. There was a power outage on Guam during the storm, but the Guam Power Authority was able to quickly restore service; this was due to the first usage of newly installed meters that showed exactly where the cuts had occurred.

Later, while passing near Okinawa, Francisco brought gusty winds and some rainfall. The threat of the storm prompted organizers to cancel a tennis tournament in Kantō. The looming storm also forced the Japanese refiner company Nansei Sekiyu KK to suspend some marine operations at its facility on Okinawa. After the storm, about 100 United States military on the island helped clear debris and sand from the road. Unsettled weather from the typhoon caused an Oita Heat Devils basketball game to be canceled. Francisco's gusty winds left about 3,800 homes without power in Kagoshima Prefecture. On Izu Ōshima, officials advised all 8,365 residents to evacuate, the first such advisory in 27 years. About 1,300 people were under mandatory evacuation orders. This was after Typhoon Wipha spawned a deadly mudslide a week prior. Evacuees were allowed to return after the storm exited the area.

See also

Typhoon Lekima (2013)
Typhoon Choi-wan (2009)
Typhoon Dolphin (2015)

Notes

References

External links

JMA General Information of Typhoon Francisco (1327) from Digital Typhoon
JMA Best Track Data of Typhoon Francisco (1327) 
JTWC Best Track Data of Super Typhoon 26W (Francisco)
26W.FRANCISCO from the U.S. Naval Research Laboratory

2013 Pacific typhoon season
Typhoons in Japan
Typhoons in Guam
Francisco
Francisco